Hot FM Network was a broadcast radio network in the Philippines owned by Manila Broadcasting Company under Radyo Natin Network. Its headquarters are located at Star City Complex, Pasay. Although, Hot FM network is owned and operated by different small media companies and colleges, while its stations in Cebu, Dagupan and Zamboanga, are fully owned and operated by MBC itself and later rebranded as YES FM. Since 2016, however, most of the Hot FM stations (under Radyo Natin management) dropped the said brand and replaced with the Radyo Natin brand, resulting the network unofficially dissolved.

History
Hot FM was launched in January 1999, broadcasting as full service stations. Hot FM's small scale provincial stations, except its owned and operated stations in Cebu, Dagupan and Zamboanga, also broadcast the latest news every morning with the simulcast of flagship station DZRH. It plays pop music format, similar to MBC FM networks Love Radio and Yes! FM.

On weekends, Hot FM airs the nationwide weekly chart program, the Weekend Top 30 Countdown, which airs every Saturday.

Hot FM stations

Provincial Hot FM stations used to be affiliated with MBC under Radyo Natin.

However, by the end of 2017 all HOT FM stations under Radyo Natin that broadcast with a minimum of 500W transmitter power and 1kW ERP (Effective Radiated Power) were instructed by MBC-Radyo Natin management to carry the Radyo Natin program format and branding. Manila Broadcasting Company (MBC) no longer use the HOT FM brand. HOT FM stations that failed to upgrade based on the rules set forth by NTC have ceased operation. Those that continue to broadcast using "HOT FM" are no longer part of MBC-Radyo Natin.

See also
 Manila Broadcasting Company
 Radyo Natin Network

 
Philippine radio networks
Manila Broadcasting Company
1999 establishments in the Philippines
2017 disestablishments in the Philippines
Defunct radio stations in the Philippines
Radio stations established in 1999
Radio stations disestablished in 2017